The United States Air Force Symbol is the symbol of the United States Air Force.  It was introduced in January 2000. Guidelines that outlined appropriate uses for the new Air Force symbol were released March 23. The symbol was first tested on gates and water towers in August.

History

In the late 1990s, Air Force senior leadership directed a commercial company, specializing in corporate branding, to research and develop a unique symbol. Company representatives traveled throughout the Air Force and to major U.S. cities to conduct research and become intimately familiar with the Air Force and its culture, environment, and heritage.

The new Air Force symbol is based on the familiar World War II Henry H. Arnold ("Hap" Arnold) wings and represents the service's heritage. The symbol's modern design represents the Air Force's present and future leading edge capabilities defending the United States.

 1998: Research, surveys and focus groups commissioned 	
 1999: Symbol designed
May 2000: Trademark registration filed
 2001: Symbol tested throughout Air Force
 2002: Survey of internal Air Force audience revealed 90% identify the new symbol as the official Air Force symbol
 September 2003: Trademark registration date. Serial #76040432 and Registration #2767190
 May 2004: USAF Chief of Staff designates Symbol as the Official Symbol of the Air Force

See also
 Space Force Delta

References

External links
 Air Force Trademark and Licensing Program for the Symbol

Heraldry of the United States military
Symbol
Symbols introduced in 2000